Sinegal is a surname. Notable people with the surname include:

 Bill Sinegal (1928–2014), American guitarist and songwriter
 James Sinegal (born 1936), American businessman
 Paul "Lil' Buck" Sinegal (1944–2019), American guitarist and singer

See also 
 Senegal